Xiaomi Mi2S (often referred to as Xiaomi Phone 2S, Chinese: 小米手机2s), is a high-end, Android smartphone produced by Xiaomi. The device features a quad-core 1.7 GHz Qualcomm Snapdragon 600 as its CPU.

Two variations of the Mi2S have been released, a 16 GB and a 32 GB model. In addition to storage amount also the back camera is also different. The 16 GB model features an 8-megapixel camera with aperture 2.0, whereas the 32 GB model features a 13-megapixel camera with aperture 2.2. Moreover, the lenses have 35 mm equivalent focal length of 27 mm on the 16 GB model compared to 28 mm on the 32 GB model. The devices were initially were sold in China for ¥1999 for the 16 GB model, and ¥2299 for the 32 GB model.

Specifications

Hardware
The casing of the Xiaomi Mi2S is mostly made from plastic, with SIM card slots located inside. The microUSB port is located at the bottom of the device with the audio jack located at the top of the device. The power and volume keys were located on the right side of device. Near the top of the device are a front-facing camera, proximity sensors, and a notification LED. In particular, the proximity sensors are mostly used to detect whether the device is in a pocket or not. The device is widely available in white, green, yellow, blue, red and pink color finishes. The device's display is larger than its predecessor, with a 4.3-inch, 720p IPS LCD capacitive touchscreen with a resolution of ~342 ppi, and Dragontrail glass.

The model is one of two variations of the Xiaomi Mi2 Xiaomi created before creating the Xiaomi Mi3. The device comes with either 16 GB or 32 GB of internal storage. It contains a 2000 mAh battery.

Software

The Xiaomi Mi2S ships with Android and Xiaomi's MIUI user experience.

See also 
 Xiaomi
 MIUI
 Comparison of smartphones

References

External links 

 

Mi 2S
Android (operating system) devices
Mobile phones introduced in 2013
Discontinued flagship smartphones
Mobile phones with user-replaceable battery